Beyond Reality may refer to:

 Beyond Reality (TV series), a 1991 Canadian/American science fiction series
 Beyond Reality (album), an album by Dreamtale
 "Beyond Reality", a song by Black Majesty from Sands of Time
 "Beyond Reality", a song by Cyann & Ben from Spring
 "Beyond Reality", a song by Savage Circus from Dreamland Manor